Obstruction Island is one of the San Juan Islands in San Juan County, Washington, United States. It lies off the southeast tip of Orcas Island, between it and Blakely Island. Obstruction Island has a land area of 0.882 km² (0.3406 sq mi, or 218 acres). The 2010 census reported a permanent population of 14 residents.

References

San Juan Islands